Senator Weinstein may refer to:

Brian Weinstein (fl. 1970s–2000s), Washington State Senate
David F. Weinstein (born 1936), North Carolina State Senate
Jeremy S. Weinstein (born 1950), New York State Senate
Peter Weinstein (born 1947), Florida State Senate